The men's long jump event at the 2015 European Athletics Indoor Championships was held on 5 March 2015 at 17:00 (qualification) and 6 March, 17:55 (final) local time.

Medalists

Records

Results

Qualification 
Qualification: Qualification Performance 8.00 (Q) or at least 8 best performers advanced to the final.

Final

References 

2015 European Athletics Indoor Championships
Long jump at the European Athletics Indoor Championships